The Kalimantan Physical Revolution was an armed conflict between Indonesian nationalists in and pro-Dutch forces in Dutch Borneo following the end of the Japanese occupation of the Dutch East Indies and the 1945 Proclamation of Indonesian Independence by Sukarno and which lasted until the Dutch withdrew from most of Indonesia in 1949. It can be considered a regional conflict in the larger Indonesian National Revolution. After the surrender of the Japanese at the end of World War II, allied forces took control of the Dutch East Indies, including Dutch Borneo. The return of Dutch authorities however, was rejected by majority of native population, including in Borneo, resulting in various regional armed conflicts between Royal Netherlands East Indies Army and Indonesian nationalist forces. Allied military forces in Borneo were in a strong position after an early conflict in August 1945, and were able to pacify local nationalist uprisings and impose a blockade to prevent military aid and exchange in personnel from nationalist strongholds in Java and Sumatra. Later, nationalists with connections to Borneo were able to breach the military blockade to provide information of revolutionary events in Java and Sumatra, declaring Kalimantan as inseparable part of the new Indonesian republic (the so-called Kalimantan proclamation).

Background 

Borneo was home to several native sultanates such as Sultanate of Banjar, Kutai, and Sultanate of Bulungan. Prior to 18th and 19th century, the Dutch began to intervene in internal matters of native sultanates, resulting conflict between the two. The most notable was Banjarmasin War, resulting in Dutch authorities eliminating most of royal institutions and declaring the sultanate cease to exist after 1863. Dutch control over the island remained weak and mostly handed over local authorities and royals that are supporting Dutch colonial establishment.

Indonesian nationalism, which only arose in Java in the 1910s, was unheard of in Borneo until the  Indonesian National Party establish branches across the island and began exporting the ideals of the Indonesian National Awakening there. The military occupation by Japan also fueled nationalist and pro-Asia sentiment, in addition to giving some natives military training which they later used against allied forces.

Conflict 

After the Indonesian declaration of Independence in 1945, various militia and armed organizations were formed across the archipelago. While nationalist sentiment was widespread between common people and grassroot movements, it was unpopular within aristocrats, especially in Kutai, East Kalimantan where royals there established a Dutch-supported East Kalimantan state. (There was also a Dutch puppet state in West Kalimantan led by Syarif Hamid II of Pontianak.) In Sambas, West Kalimantan, in October 1945, a clash occurred between nationalists wanted to replace flag of the Netherlands with red and white flag on official buildings, and pro-Dutch partisans, later known as "Bloody Sambas". Following the clash, several other engagements also occurred within inland regions in Landak and Melawi. Nationalist opposition to the Dutch was severely impeded by the Dutch military strength and the blockade which cut off nationalists from their counterparts in Java. In South Kalimantan, armed opposition was led by Hasan Basry in Meratus Mountains, with smaller conflicts occurring in Kotabaru and Tanah Laut. Anti-royalty and anti-Dutch sentiment were thought to be driven by influence of Communist Party of Indonesia in the region, which was exceptionally strong in South and East Kalimantan. The Indonesian Navy, which had been founded in 1946, also sent secret emissaries to establish communication with nationlists in Kalimantan, to give them support and to attempt to bring them under their command. However, those armed elements did not have the power to displace the Dutch, who forced an agreement for the United States of Indonesia in 1946 in which Dutch puppet states in Borneo and elsewhere would be equal partners to the republic of Indonesia.

In October 1947, newly formed Indonesian Airforce (AURI) conducted its first ever airborne operation led by Tjilik Riwut in what today is Central Kalimantan using a Douglas DC-3 aircraft disguised as civilian plane. The group, named MN/1001 (Muhammad Noor 1001), consist of only 14 personnel, mostly Kalimantan-born. The goal was to break Dutch-imposed blockade and send back several Kalimantan-born nationalist back from Java. Only 13 personnel were deployed from the plane and one allegedly deserted, leaving only 12 on the ground. The group engaged against Dutch troops close to village of Pahandut, today Palangka Raya city. The group was ambushed on 23 November, leaving three killed while the rest fled until the entirety of the group was captured on 7 December. They were jailed in Banjarmasin before released in the aftermath of Dutch–Indonesian Round Table Conference.

The Kalimantan Proclamation of 1949 
On 17 May 1949, Hasan Basry declared Kalimantan as integral part of Indonesian Republic and opposed any act to grant it independence from Indonesia. The proclamation was read on Kandangan and later printed and circulated around Banjarmasin and Pontianak. Prior to declaration, Dutch authorities send an ultimatum to Hasan Basry and his followers to surrender.

Indonesian version:

English version:

End of the conflict 

After the proclamation, the conflict in Kalimantan continued to take place. The Dutch did not recognize the proclamation and made a military push to limit the actual reach of Basry's claim to establishing a new Indonesian territory on Kalimantan soil. Starting in the late summer, while the Dutch–Indonesian Round Table Conference was being negotiated in The Hague, Indonesian defense ministers Mohammad Hatta (replaced by Hamengkubuwono IX during the negotiations) sent a military force led by Major General Soehardjo to peacefully observe the state of affairs in Banjarmasin, where the Dutch KNIL forces were still mobilized. Yet the guerilla actions, strikes, targeted killings of KNIL soldiers, and theft of supplies from the Dutch side continued in late 1949. As the Republican position was strengthened, Basry attempted to impose military discipline over the remaining guerilla forces, some of whom had even conducted raids on Republican positions. However, the end of the military conflict came not as a result of military defeat of Dutch forces, but because the Netherlands were forced to cede sovereignty to Indonesia at the negotiating table in December 1949.

Legacy 

Several monuments and statues exist in Kalimantan to commemorate the conflict and 17 May Proclamation. 17th May Stadium was named after the proclamation. A folk song titled Kampung Batuah created by local artist Anang Ardiansyah contains lyrics about the event.

Citations 

Indonesian National Revolution
Battles of the Indonesian National Revolution
History of Borneo
Separatism in Indonesia